The Phoenix Towers are proposed supertall skyscrapers planned for construction in Wuhan, China.

The towers are being designed by Chetwoods Architects. Completion was planned for by the end of 2018 at a cost of £1.2 billion. As of January 2022, construction has not started.

Description 

The Phoenix Towers are being designed by London-based Chetwoods Architects in partnership with the HuangYan Group. The project will consist of two buildings, representing the male and female dualistic aspects of Chinese culture. The taller tower, Feng, will have about 100 floors for residential living, offices and retail space. The slightly smaller Huang tower, named after the family, will contain "the world's tallest garden", proposed by the Huangs. The towers will be constructed on an island in a lake, covering a  site.

The buildings will be constructed on a steel superstructure with concrete cores and buttresses. The exterior will be covered in solar panels.

The towers will incorporate green energy technologies including wind, solar, thermal, biomass boilers and hydrogen fuel cells.

References

External links
Chetwoods Architects Project Profile

Towers in China
Buildings and structures in Wuhan
Proposed skyscrapers in China